Graham Cummings Brown (born 21 March 1944) is an English former professional footballer who played as a goalkeeper in the Football League for Mansfield Town, Doncaster Rovers, Swansea City, York City and Rotherham United, in the North American Soccer League for Portland Timbers, in non-League football for Crawley Town, Southport and Boston United and was on the books of Millwall, Brighton & Hove Albion and Watford without making a league appearance. After retiring, he worked as chief scout at Rotherham and Oldham Athletic.

References

1944 births
Living people
People from Matlock, Derbyshire
Footballers from Derbyshire
English footballers
Association football goalkeepers
Crawley Town F.C. players
Millwall F.C. players
Mansfield Town F.C. players
Doncaster Rovers F.C. players
Portland Timbers (1975–1982) players
Swansea City A.F.C. players
Southport F.C. players
York City F.C. players
Rotherham United F.C. players
Brighton & Hove Albion F.C. players
Watford F.C. players
Boston United F.C. players
English Football League players
North American Soccer League (1968–1984) players
National League (English football) players
Rotherham United F.C. non-playing staff
Oldham Athletic A.F.C. non-playing staff
English expatriate sportspeople in the United States
Expatriate soccer players in the United States
English expatriate footballers